South Main Street Historic District is a national historic district located at Fayette, Howard County, Missouri.   The district encompasses 21 contributing buildings and 3 contributing structures in a predominantly residential section of Glasgow.  It developed between about 1830 and 1935 and includes representative examples of Italianate and Queen Anne style architecture. Located in the district is the separately listed Edwin and Nora Payne Bedford House.  Other notable buildings include the V. M Grigsby house (c. 1905), R. M. Moon house (c. 1923), Denneny sisters house (c. 1923), Joseph Shepard house / Joseph Davis house (c. 1828), Joseph Howard house (c. 1907), Thomas Howard house (1901), J. D. Tolson house (c. 1878), and the Robert Wilhoit house (c. 1935).

It was listed on the National Register of Historic Places in 1999.

References

Historic districts on the National Register of Historic Places in Missouri
Italianate architecture in Missouri
Queen Anne architecture in Missouri
Buildings and structures in Howard County, Missouri
National Register of Historic Places in Howard County, Missouri